Nicolas Renavand (born 25 June 1982) is a French tennis player playing on the ATP Challenger Tour. On 15 April 2013, he reached his highest ATP singles ranking of World No. 225, whilst his highest doubles ranking of 128 was reached on 8 July 2013.

Challenger finals

Doubles: 7 (3–4)

References

External links

 
 

1982 births
Living people
French male tennis players